The 2008 O'Byrne Cup was a Gaelic football competition played by the teams of Leinster GAA. The competition differs from the Leinster Senior Football Championship as it also features further education colleges and the winning team does not progress to another tournament at All-Ireland level. Last years winners of the O'Byrne Cup were Dublin. The first game was between defending champions Dublin and Wicklow, Dublin won the game comfortably.

O'Byrne Cup

First round
The eight winning teams from the first round of the O'Byrne Cup go on to qualify for the quarter finals of the tournament. The losers of the first round go on to the O'Byrne Shield quarter finals.

Quarter-finals

Semi-finals

Final

O'Byrne Shield
The 8 losing first round competitors of the O'Byrne Cup went on to contest the O'Byrne shield.  The final of the Shield was postponed from its original date of 9 February 2008, due to a family bereavement of one of the players, and a National Football League match between the two teams doubled as the O'Byrne Shield final. This game ended in a draw, and the decision was taken not to have a replay.

See also
 2008 Dr McKenna Cup

References

O'Byrne Cup
O'Byrne Cup